Jagdev Singh Rai (8 July 1969 – 18 December 2019) was an Indian field hockey player. He competed in the men's tournament at the 1992 Summer Olympics.

References

External links
 

1969 births
2019 deaths
Indian male field hockey players
Olympic field hockey players of India
Field hockey players at the 1992 Summer Olympics
Place of birth missing